Rigobert (died c. 743) was a Benedictine monk and later abbot of the Abbaye Saint-Pierre d'Orbais who subsequently succeeded Saint Rieul as bishop of Reims in 698. He is venerated as a saint in the Catholic Church.

Rigobert baptized Charles Martel, but Charles afterwards had him brutally driven from the see and replaced, for political reasons, by the warlike and unpriestly Milo, who was already Archbishop of Trier. Rigobert took refuge in Aquitaine and then retired to Gernicourt, in the Diocese of Soissons, where he led a life in the exercises of penance and prayer.

He died about the year 743, and was buried in the church of Saint Peter at Gernicourt, which he had built. Hincmar translated his relics to the abbey of Saint Theodoric, and later, to the church of Saint Dionysius at Reims. Fulk, Hincmar's successor, removed them into the metropolitan Church of Our Lady of Reims, in which the greater part is preserved in a rich shrine, though a portion is kept in the church of Saint Dionysius at Reims, and another portion in the cathedral of Paris, where a chapel bears his name.

His feast day is 4 January.<ref> Saint Rigobert of Rheims; Catholic Daily Readings; accessed 2022-12-08

References

External links
Rigobert at Patron Saints Index

St. Rigobert's dinner
The Golden Legend — The Life of Saint Rigobert

Year of birth missing
745 deaths
7th-century Frankish bishops
Bishops of Reims
8th-century Frankish bishops
8th-century Frankish saints